WPRM may refer to:

WPRM-FM, a radio station in Puerto Rico operated by Cadena Salsoul
Western Pacific Railroad Museum, a museum in Portola, California, United States
Worker-Peasant Red Guards, also translated as Workers and Peasants' Red Militia, North Korean paramilitary force